General elections were held in Islamabad Capital Territory on Saturday
11 May 2013 to elect 2 member of National Assembly of Pakistan from Islamabad.

Pakistan Muslim League (N) and Pakistan Tehreek-e-Insaf won one seat each from Islamabad.

Candidates 
Total no of 77 Candidates including 43 Independents contested for 2 National Assembly Seats from Islamabad.

Result 

Party Wise

Constituency wise

By-Elections 
Makhdoom Javed Hashmi Vacated his seat in Favor of NA-149 Multan. Asad Umar of Pakistan Tehreek-e-Insaf Won NA-48 by margin of 6,887 votes. Turn out was 32% which was low compared to 59.64% in General Elections.

References 

2013 elections in Pakistan
General elections in Pakistan